Lawler is an unincorporated community in Gallatin County, Illinois, United States.

The community has the name of Michael Kelly Lawler, a General in the American Civil War.

References

Unincorporated communities in Gallatin County, Illinois
Unincorporated communities in Illinois